Toxidia is a genus of butterflies in the subfamily Trapezitinae of family  Hesperiidae. The contained species are found in the Australasian realm.

Species
The genus includes the following species:

 Toxidia andersoni Kirby, 1893
 Toxidia arfakensis Joicey & Talbot, 1917
 Toxidia doubledayi Felder, 1862
 Toxidia inornatus Butler, 1883
 Toxidia melania Waterhouse, 1903
 Toxidia parvulus Plötz, 1884
 Toxidia peron Latreille, 1824
 Toxidia rietmanni Semper, 1879
 Toxidia thyrrhus Mabille, 1891

References
 Natural History Museum Lepidoptera genus database
 Toxidia at funet

Trapezitinae
Hesperiidae genera